Gangdwar is a large village located in Andharthaull Block of Madhubani district, Bihar, India with total 1142 families residing. The Gangdwar village has population of 5293 of which 2831 are males while 2462 are females as per Population Census 2011.

In Gangdwar village population of children with age 0-6 is 860 which makes up 16.25% of total population of village. Average Sex Ratio of Gangdwar village is 870 which is lower than Bihar state average of 918. Child Sex Ratio for the Gangdwar as per census is 842, lower than Bihar average of 935.

Gangdwar village has lower literacy rate compared to Bihar. In 2011, literacy rate of Gangdwar village was 56.42% compared to 61.80% of Bihar. In Gangdwar Male literacy stands at 67.81% while female literacy rate was 43.40%.

As per constitution of India and Panchyati Raaj Act, Gangdwar village is administrated by Sarpanch (Head of Village) who is elected representative of village.

 Gangdwar Data

Villages in Madhubani district